Deep Space is a 1988 sci-fi horror film directed by Fred Olen Ray about a monster that terrorizes a city in the United States and the detective who must stop it.

Plot
The United States military loses control of a secret satellite that contains a biological weapon. Upon crashing, the weapon escapes near Los Angeles and begins to terrorize the citizens. Police Lieutenant McLemore is given the job of trying to stop the monster before it kills more people and escapes into the surrounding area.

Cast
 Charles Napier as Det. Ian McLemore
 Ann Turkel as Carla Sandbourn
 Bo Svenson as Capt. Robertson
 Ron Glass as Jerry Merris
 Julie Newmar as Lady Elaine Wentworth
 James Booth as Dr. Forsyth
 Norman Burton as Gen. Randolph
 Jesse Dabson as Jason
 Elisabeth Brooks as Mrs. Ridley
 Anthony Eisley as Dr. Rogers

Reception
On Rotten Tomatoes it has 1 negative review  as of April 2020.  Creature Feature gave the movie 3 our of 5 stars, praising the cast and finding it better than Ray's other movies.

References

External links
 
 Deep Space - Rotten Tomatoes
 Deep Space Review - B Movies Review
 

1988 films
1988 horror films
1980s English-language films
1980s science fiction horror films
American science fiction horror films
Films directed by Fred Olen Ray
Films scored by Robert O. Ragland
1980s American films